Vicki Louise Burtt (born 29 January 1958) is a New Zealand former cricketer who played as a right-handed batter and right-arm medium bowler. She appeared in 4 Test matches and 9 One Day Internationals for New Zealand between 1977 and 1982, and played at two World Cups. She played domestic cricket for Canterbury.

Her son, Leighton, played cricket for Canterbury from 2005–06 to 2009–10.

References

External links

1958 births
Living people
Cricketers from Christchurch
New Zealand women cricketers
New Zealand women Test cricketers
New Zealand women One Day International cricketers
Canterbury Magicians cricketers